Silver City may refer to:

Places

United States
Silver City, California
Silver City, Georgia
Silver City, Idaho, a ghost town
Silver City, Iowa
Silver City, Michigan
Silver City, Mississippi
Silver City, Montana, a community in Lewis and Clark County
Silver City, New Mexico
Silver City, North Carolina
Silver City, Nevada
Silver City, Oklahoma, a ghost town
Silver City, South Dakota
Silver City, Utah, a ghost town

Canada
Silver City, Yukon

Australia
Silver City Highway, a highway in New South Wales
Silver City, Christmas Island

Nicknames
Broken Hill, New South Wales, Australia
Cuttack, Odisha, India
Tong'an District, Fujian, People's Republic of China
Aberdeen, United Kingdom, the "Silver City with the Golden Sands"
Sheffield, United Kingdom
Las Vegas, Nevada, United States
Meriden, Connecticut, United States
Taunton, Massachusetts, United States
Silver City Galleria, a large two-story indoor shopping mall in Taunton, Massachusetts
Schoonhoven, Netherlands

Films
Silver City (1951 film), starring Edmond O'Brien
Silver City (1984 film), an Australian film
Silver City (2004 film), written and directed by John Sayles
Albuquerque (film), a 1948 American film titled Silver City in Australia

Music
Silver City (Falling Up album), 2013
Silver City, an album by Brian Cadd, 2019
Silver City, an album by Joe Ely, 2007
The Silver City, an album by Jeremy Messersmith, 2008
"(Theme from) Silver City", a 1961 song by the Ventures

Other uses
Silver City Airways, a British airline
SilverCity, a Canadian movie theater chain run by Cineplex Entertainment
The Silver City, a 1956 memoir by Ion Idriess
Silver City, a 2004 book, second in The Silver Sequence by Cliff McNish

See also
Siler City, North Carolina